Clifford Lorenza "Sleepy" Blackmon (March 25, 1914 – December 17, 1995) was an American baseball pitcher in the Negro leagues. He played with several teams from 1937 to 1941.

Blackmon was regarded as the ace of the Black Barons in 1938, and was compared to Satchel Paige in the Quad-City Times.

References

External links
 and Seamheads

Atlanta Black Crackers players
St. Louis–New Orleans Stars players
Chicago American Giants players
Birmingham Black Barons players
Memphis Red Sox players
New York Cubans players
1914 births
1995 deaths
Baseball players from Alabama
Baseball pitchers
20th-century African-American sportspeople